{{Infobox person
| name        = Sophie Clarke
| birth_name = Sophie Georgina Clarke
| birth_place   = Willsboro, New York
| birth_date = 
| television =Survivor: South Pacific (winner)Survivor: Winners at War
| spouse = 
| children = 2
}}

Sophie Georgina Clarke (born July 10, 1989) is a reality television personality known for competing in and winning Survivor: South Pacific. She later returned for the show's 40th season Survivor: Winners at War, where she finished in tenth place.

 Early life 
 She attended Mount Sinai School of Medicine in New York City. She married her husband, Robert Shady, on August 24, 2019.

Survivor

South Pacific
Clarke was one of 18 contestants on Survivor: South Pacific, the 23rd season of Survivor. On the first night, she formed a final five alliance that would dominate the game with fellow contestants Benjamin "Coach" Wade, Rick Nelson, Brandon Hantz, and Albert Destrade. Wade then recruited Edna Ma as the sixth member of their alliance. After the merge, the six player alliance eliminated all of the other players from the game.

Clarke won her first immunity challenge on Day 27 of the game. After that night's tribal council vote, another immunity challenge immediately took place, which she also won. At the game's final immunity challenge, Ozzy Lusth had a significant lead in the beginning, but after he got stuck on the puzzle, Clarke came from behind to win, and Lusth was subsequently voted out and became the last jury member.

With Clarke, Wade, and Destrade as the Final Three, she began to reflect on the game and how it changed her. She felt she outplayed, outlasted and outwitted everyone by winning the most immunity challenges and by keeping her first day alliance intact. In the end, the jury rewarded her in a 6–3–0 vote over Wade and Destrade. She received votes from Hantz, Lusth, Whitney Duncan, Dawn Meehan, Jim Rice, and Keith Tollefson.

Winners at War
Clarke came back and competed on the 40th season titled Winners at War''. Initially a member of the Dakal tribe, Clarke found herself in a comfortable alliance with Yul Kwon, Nick Wilson, and Wendell Holland, who bonded over being otherwise unconnected in a tribe where the remaining castaways had prior relationships. This new alliance served Clarke well for the early days of the game, protecting her until the Tribe Switch.

When the tribes swapped, Clarke became a member of the newly formed Yara tribe with former Dakal tribemate Sarah Lacina, as well as three former Sele members: "Boston Rob" Mariano, Ben Driebergen, and Adam Klein. After losing immunity, Clarke quickly found herself in the minority along with Lacina, but she was able to find the hidden immunity idol. She gave one half of it to Lacina to solidify their alliance. Lacina gave it back to Clarke before Tribal Council just in case she needed to use it. Lacina and Clarke were successfully able to convince Driebergen and Klein to flip against Mariano and he was voted out unanimously.

When the tribes merged, Clarke found herself in a new alliance with Lacina, Driebergen, Tony Vlachos and Denise Stapley, but she felt betrayed by her former alliance from Dakal, which had turned on itself and voted out Kwon right before the merge. Seeking revenge as well as recognizing his growing attachment to Jeremy Collins, Clarke set her sights on Holland. Her machinations were successful and Holland was voted out. However, her flourishing social bonds with Lacina did not go unnoticed by Vlachos, who worried that Clarke's influence might work against him in the end. Vlachos set about a plan to blindside Clarke, and at the Final Nine, he successfully ousted an unsuspecting Clarke while she still had possession of her idol. Clarke joined the rest of the eliminated players on the Edge of Extinction, but after failing to win the re-entry challenge on Day 35, she was sent to the jury in tenth place.

At the Final Tribal Council, Clarke cast her vote for Vlachos to win. Vlachos would ultimately win his second Sole Survivor title in a 12-4-0 victory over Natalie Anderson (who had won the re-entry challenge) and Michele Fitzgerald.

Filmography

Television

References

External links
Sophie on CBS.com

1989 births
Living people
Middlebury College alumni
Participants in American reality television series
People from Willsboro, New York
Survivor (American TV series) winners
Winners in the Survivor franchise